An intangible good is claimed to be a type of good that does not have a physical nature, as opposed to a physical good (an object). Digital goods such as downloadable music, mobile apps or virtual goods used in virtual economies are proposed to be examples of intangible goods.

Further reading 
 Bannock, Graham et al.. (1997). Dictionary of Economics, Penguin Books.
 Milgate, Murray (1987), "goods and commodities," The New Palgrave: A Dictionary of Economics, v. 2, pp. 546–48. Includes historical and contemporary uses of the terms in economics.

Goods (economics)